hit is an Australian commercial radio station broadcasting to regional areas of Western Australia. Owned and operated by Southern Cross Austereo, the station broadcasts a contemporary hit radio music format with a breakfast show based from studios in Perth, Western Australia.

History
The stations were established between 1997 and 1999, under the Hot FM brand first used in Queensland. In 2004, Hot FM and sister stations RadioWest were sold to Macquarie Regional RadioWorks.

Under the ownership of DMG Regional Radio, network stations broadcast a variety of local and networked programming, from network hubs based in Bunbury, Albury and the Gold Coast. Following the merger of Southern Cross Media with Austereo in February 2011, the Hot FM network – along with Sea FM and Star FM regional counterparts – became more closely aligned with the Today Network, including networking programming from 2DayFM Sydney and Fox FM Melbourne.

On 15 December 2016, as part of a national brand consolidation by parent company Southern Cross Austereo, the station was merged into the Hit Network.

In 2020 Southern Cross Austereo purchased the Red Wave Media Group formerly owned and operated by the Seven West Media Group. At 8.00 am on Monday 16th March 2020 the Red FM branded frequencies changed their branding to become part of the Hit Network.

Transmitters
Hit Western Australia is broadcast via 9 full power stations.

In addition, the 13 full power stations feed a further 17 repeater stations.

References

Radio stations in Western Australia
Contemporary hit radio stations in Australia